1036 Ganymed, provisional designation , is a stony asteroid on a highly eccentric orbit, classified as a near-Earth object of the Amor group. It was discovered by German astronomer Walter Baade at the Bergedorf Observatory in Hamburg on 23 October 1924, and named after Ganymede from Greek mythology. The S-type asteroid has a rotation period of 10.3 hours.

Orbit and classification 

Ganymed is an Amor asteroid, a subgroup of the near-Earth asteroids that approach the orbit of Earth from beyond, but do not cross it. It orbits the Sun at a distance of 1.2–4.1 AU about once every 4 years and 4 months (i.e., 52 months or 1,587 days; semi-major axis of 2.66 AU). Its orbit has a high eccentricity of 0.53 and an inclination of 27° with respect to the ecliptic.

Close approaches

Earth approach

Mars approach
Due to the high eccentricity of its orbit, Ganymed is also a Mars-crosser, intersecting the orbit of the Red Planet at 1.66 AU.

Name 
The minor planet of Ganymed was named after Ganymede from Greek mythology, using the German spelling ("Ganymed"). Ganymede was a Trojan prince abducted by Zeus to serve as a cup-bearer to the Greek gods. The name had previously also been given to Jupiter's third moon, "Ganymede", which was discovered in 1610 by Italian astronomer Galileo Galilei.

Physical characteristics 

Owing to its early discovery date, Ganymed has a rich observational history. A 1931 paper published the absolute magnitude, based on observations to date, as 9.24, slightly brighter than the present value of 9.45.

Ganymed is a stony S-type asteroid, in the Tholen, SMASS and in the S3OS2 taxonomy. This means that it is relatively reflective and composed of iron and magnesium silicates. Spectral measurements put Ganymed in the S (VI) spectral subtype, indicating a surface rich in orthopyroxenes, and possibly metals (although if metals are present they are covered and not readily apparent in the spectra).

Diameter and albedo 
According to the surveys carried out by the Infrared Astronomical Satellite IRAS, the Japanese Akari satellite and the NEOWISE mission of NASA's Wide-field Infrared Survey Explorer (WISE), Ganymed measures between 31.66 and 37.67 kilometers in diameter and its surface has an albedo between 0.218 and 0.293.

The Collaborative Asteroid Lightcurve Link derives an albedo of 0.2809 and a mean-diameter of 31.57 kilometers based on an absolute magnitude of 9.50. Carry published a diameter  kilometers in 2012.

An occultation of a star by Ganymed was observed from California on 22 August 1985. Additional observations in 2011 gave an occultation cross-section with a semi-major and minor axis of 39.3 and 18.9 kilometers, respectively.

Rotation and poles 
A large number of rotational lightcurves of Ganymed have been obtained from photometric observations since 1985. Analysis of the best-rated lightcurves obtained by American photometrist Frederick Pilcher at his Organ Mesa Observatory  in New Mexico during 2011 gave a rotation period of 10.297 hours with a consolidated brightness amplitude between 0.28 and 0.31 magnitude.

Three studies using modeled photometric data from the Uppsala Asteroid Photometric Catalogue, WISE thermal infrared data and other sources, gave a concurring period of 10.313, 10.31284, and 10.31304 hours, respectively. Each modeled lightcurve also determined two spin axes of (214.0°, −73.0°), (190.0°, −78.0°), as well as (198.0°, −79.0°) in ecliptic coordinates (λ, β; L1/B1), respectively.

In 1998, radar observations of Ganymed by the Arecibo radio telescope produced images of the asteroid, revealing a roughly spherical object. Polarimetric observations conducted by Japanese astronomers concluded that there was a weak correlation between the object's light- and polarimetry curve as a function of rotation angle. Because polarization is dependent on surface terrain and composition, rather than the observed size of the object like the lightcurve, this suggests that the surface features of the asteroid are roughly uniform over its observed surface.

References

Further reading

External links 
 Radar Images of 1036 Ganymed, Arecibo Observatory project R1150
 Frederick Pilcher – lightcurves, Astronomical Society of Las Cruzes
 Lightcurve Database Query (LCDB), at www.minorplanet.info
 Dictionary of Minor Planet Names, Google books
 Asteroids and comets rotation curves, CdR – Geneva Observatory, Raoul Behrend
 Discovery Circumstances: Numbered Minor Planets (1)-(5000) – Minor Planet Center
 
 
 

001036
Discoveries by Walter Baade
Named minor planets
001036
001036
19241023